Irina Romanova may refer to:

Irina Romanova (figure skater) (born 1972), Ukrainian ice dancer
Princess Irina Alexandrovna of Russia (1895–1970), member of the House of Holstein-Gottorp-Romanov
Tsarevna Irina Mikhailovna of Russia (1627–1679), oldest daughter of Russian tsar Mikhail Fyodorovich

See also 
Irina of Russia (disambiguation)